This was the first edition of the tournament.

Mayar Sherif won the title, defeating Tamara Korpatsch in the final, 7–6(7–1), 6–4.

Seeds

Draw

Finals

Top half

Bottom half

References

External Links
 Main draw

2022 WTA 125 tournaments
2022 in Spanish tennis